Darpanarayan Tagore (1731–1793) was a member of the Tagore family, who branched to Pathuriaghata. He worked as dewan to the French East India Company at Chandannagar before moving to Calcutta. He later became a merchant to Edward Wheeler, who succeeded Colonel Monson as member of the Supreme Council of Bengal headed by Warren Hastings. He later purchased a large zamindari estate in his name at Rajshahi and 
established himself as one of the leading zamindars in Bengal. He was succeeded by his son Gopi Mohan Tagore.

See also
Nilmoni Tagore

References

1731 births
1793 deaths
Businesspeople from Kolkata
Bengali zamindars
Tagore family
People from Hooghly district
Bengali Hindus
18th-century Bengalis
Social workers from West Bengal